The pouched frog (Assa darlingtoni), or hip pocket frog, is a small, terrestrial frog found in rainforests in mountain areas of south-eastern Queensland and northern New South Wales, Australia. It is one of two species within the genus Assa, the other being Assa wollumbin and is part of the family Myobatrachidae.

Description
It is a small frog about 2.5 cm long, red-brown in colour, with some individuals having reverse V shaped patches and/or with light brown dots randomly on their backs. Most specimens have a darker brown stripe that runs from the nostril through the eye down the side of the body. A skin fold is present on either side of the frog running from its eye to its hip. Its hands and feet are completely free of webbing and discs, but the tips of the fingers and toes are swollen. The eye is gold with brown flecks and when the pupil is constricted it is horizontal. There is a 'pocket' on its hip where the frog's tadpoles travel to after hatching.

The hip-pocket frog living in Australia has been affected by the forest fires of Australia. The fires is not suitable for the pocket frog and is now classified as endangered and vulnerable. Although the frog has a unique reproductive method where the male carries the developing tadpoles in the pouch by its hips until metamorphosis. The male species has a greater parental care in the development of the new organisms.

Ecology and behaviour
This frog hides under logs, rocks, and leaf litter in rainforests and adjacent wet sclerophyll forests. It may call through the day but calling is most intense during dawn and dusk. Its call is a very quiet eh-eh-eh-eh-eh-eh, usually six to ten notes. This frog crawls rather than hops. Females are believed to first start breeding between 2 and 3 years and a single female may produce 1–50 eggs a year. Eggs are laid on the land (under decomposing logs, rock or leaf litter) as the tadpoles do not need water for metamorphosis. Breeding takes place during spring and summer. Both male and female frogs guard the nest of eggs and the male carries the tadpoles in the pouch once they have hatched. The tadpoles will reside in the pouch until they have morphed.

This species formerly experienced declines; however, it has recovered.

Similar species
The second species in the genus, Assa wollumbin, is smaller and reaches only 1.6 cm in leghth. Assa darlingtoni may be confused with some species of Philoria and Crinia, which live in the same area. Philoria species show thicker arms than Assa darlingtoni, Crinia species have a rougher belly texture.

References

  Database entry includes a range map and a brief justification of why this species is of least concern
Frogs Australia Network – frog call sound clip available here.
 New South Wales Office of Environment and Heritage (2014) 'Pouched Frog- profile', http://www.environment.nsw.gov.au/threatenedspeciesapp/profile.aspx?id=10070 accessed 7 August 2016. Includes recovery strategies.
Mahony MJ, Hines HB, Mahony SV, et al. A new hip-pocket frog from mid-eastern Australia (Anura: Myobatrachidae: Assa). Zootaxa. 2021 Oct;5057(4):451-486. 
Simon Clulow, Michael Mahony, Lang Elliott, Sarah Humfeld & H. Carl Gerhardt (2017) Near-synchronous calling in the hip-pocket frog Assa darlingtoni, Bioacoustics, 26:3, 249-258, 
Pickrell, John. “As Fires Rage across Australia, Fears Grow for Rare ...” As Fires Rage across Australia, Fears Grow for Rare Species, doi: 10.1126/science.aba6144

Myobatrachidae
Amphibians of Queensland
Amphibians of New South Wales
Amphibians described in 1933
Frogs of Australia